"Till the End of Time" is a popular song written by lyricist Buddy Kaye and composer Ted Mossman and published in 1945. The melody is based on Frédéric Chopin's Polonaise in A flat major, Op. 53, the "Polonaise héroique".

A number of recordings of the song were made in 1945. The biggest hit was by Perry Como; another version by Dick Haymes also charted; the Les Brown orchestra, with vocalist Doris Day, and Ginny Simms also made a recording of the song.

Como's single first reached the Billboard magazine charts on August 9, 1945, and lasted 17 weeks on the chart, peaking at No. 1 (spending 10 consecutive weeks at the top). This was Como's first No. 1 hit song, and first single to sell two million copies.  The song lends its title to the 1946 film of the same name, about American veterans returning home from World War II, and Como's version is heard several times in the film itself.

Haymes single first reached the Billboard magazine charts on September 13, 1945 and lasted eight weeks on the chart, peaking at No. 3 and the one by Les Brown/Doris Day peaked at No. 3 on the Billboard magazine pop chart.

References

1945 songs
1945 singles
Doris Day songs
Perry Como songs
Number-one singles in the United States
Songs with lyrics by Buddy Kaye
Songs with music by Ted Mossman